William Davison (21 December 1608) was secretary to Queen Elizabeth I.  He played a key and diplomatic role in the 1587 execution of Mary, Queen of Scots, and was made the scapegoat for this event in British history.  As a Secretary of some influence, he was active in forging alliances with England's Protestant friends in Holland and Scotland to prevent war with France.

Court official
Davison was of Scottish descent. In June 1566, when acting as secretary to Henry Killigrew, he was recommended to the English court for a mission to oversee Mary Stuart on the birth of her son. Discreetly, he assured her that Queen Elizabeth wanted her son to inherit the English throne. Killigrew heartily recommended him to Walsingham by stating that "Mr Davison hath deserved more....". Davison was a member of the Council's Puritan group around the Earl of Leicester and Francis Walsingham.

In 1576-7 Davison was sent on at least three separate missions to France to attempt to broker peace, and prevent war with England. He perceived the Spanish Governor of the Netherlands to be cruel and vengeful. He wrote his patron Leicester many times, strongly urging an alliance with the Prince of Orange to stop a Catholic alliance forming for an invasion of England. As his influence slipped away, Davison complained of ill-health and the cost of his embassy. In May 1579 he returned to England. He was granted, by the Queen herself, the reversion of the Clerk of Treasury's office on 16 January 1578, to which he eventually succeeded years later.
 
In 1582–3, he was sent to Scotland by Elizabeth on missions to communicate with Mary, Queen of Scots, to escort the ambassador of King Henri III of France, and to secure an audience with King James. Tactful and helpful, Davison worked closely with the Queen's agent, Robert Bowes until September 1584. The death of the Anglophile William the Silent, Prince of Orange, necessitated yet another mission to the Netherlands for Davison, already an experienced diplomat. He was assisted by William Brewster, who was later a passenger on the Mayflower.

Although praised for his diplomatic role by the Puritan Earl of Leicester, when he returned he found the Queen incensed by their assumption of the Governorship in Amsterdam; they had behaved too independently for an English mission. In a typically trenchant mood, Davison saw no need to apologise, but rather insisted that he would pray the Queen changed course. His biographer, Nicolas, described Davison as becoming depressed, withdrawing from Court to nurse his wounded Presbyterian pride. Davison eventually drifted away from Leicester, his erstwhile patron, and more towards the extreme war party around Walsingham. In the same year he became member of parliament for Knaresborough, a privy councillor, and assistant to Elizabeth's secretary, Francis Walsingham; but from 30 September 1586, he appears to have acted more as a colleague than a subordinate of Walsingham.

Davison was a member of the commission appointed to try Mary, Queen of Scots, although he took no part in its proceedings. The judges sat on 11 October and proceedings began on the 14th. It was prorogued four days later, only to meet again on the 25th in the Star Chamber at Westminster. In her absence the Queen was still found guilty. On the 29th Parliament petitioned for execution to be carried out. 

Meanwhile, the Privy Council, having been summoned by Lord Burghley, decided to draft the warrant on 6 December, two days after the Queen's Proclamation, and carry out the sentence at once. When sentence was passed upon Mary, the warrant for her execution was entrusted to Davison who, after some delay, obtained the Queen's signature on 1 February. . On this occasion, and also in subsequent interviews with her secretary, Elizabeth suggested that Mary should be executed in some more secret fashion, and her conversation afforded ample proof that she disliked the idea of taking any responsibility upon herself for the death of her rival. Elizabeth ordered Davison to hold on to it, unsealed. Davison passed it over to Burghley, who immediately dispatched it to Fotheringhay Castle. Mary was beheaded on 8 February 1587. Officially Davison continued as principal secretary until Walsingham's death in April 1590. Yet, Walsingham the spymaster remained the more dominant personality, and is generally considered to be behind the scheme to execute the Queen of Scots.

Scapegoat
When the news of the execution reached Elizabeth she was extremely indignant, and her wrath was chiefly directed against Davison, who, she asserted, had disobeyed her instructions not to seal the warrant, but this instruction did not arrive until 2 February 1587, and Burghley had already taken the initiative. The secretary was arrested and thrown into the Tower, but although he defended himself vigorously, he did not say anything about the Queen's wish to get rid of Mary by assassination. Charged before the Star Chamber with misprision and contempt, he was acquitted of evil intention, but was sentenced to pay a fine of 10,000 marks and to imprisonment during the Queen's pleasure. Owing to the exertions of several influential men he was released in September 1588, after the invasion crisis had passed; the Queen, however, refused to employ him again in her service, but he kept his office, and probably never paid the fine. His friends, notably the Earl of Essex, tried to get him the exercise of the Secretary's office, particularly after Walsingham's death in 1590. However, Burghley coveted the post, keeping it vacant for his son Robert Cecil. Davison was excluded from the emoluments of office for the remainder of the reign. And James I was even less likely to offer preferment.

Davison and family retired to Stepney, where he died on 21 December 1608, and was buried on the 24th. The fruits of the office of Custos Brevium were "benefit of said office wholly to me and my assigns".  Despite mortgaging his home in 1579, it seems his widow was not evicted; the debt was not called until much later.

Davison appears to have been an industrious and outspoken man, and was undoubtedly made the scapegoat for the Queen's conduct. By his wife, Catherine Spelman, daughter of Henry Spelman of Norfolk, whom he married around 1570, he had a family of four sons and two daughters. His wife was Leicester's 'cousin' by marriage.

Two of his sons, Francis and Walter, obtained some celebrity as poets.

Many state papers written by him, and many of his letters, are extant in various manuscript collections. His will's executors were brothers of Gray's Inn, George and Robert Byng, who had mortgaged his house in Stepney. Davison left his widow with large debts. When all debts were paid on the sale of the house, his second son Christopher Davison was to inherit the right to a Treasury Office as stated in the will proven 9 January 1609.

In popular culture 
He is a minor character in the play Maria Stuart by Friedrich Schiller.

Notes

References

Bibliography 
 Nicholas Harris Nicolas, Life of William Davison: Secretary of State and Privy Counsellor to Queen Elizabeth, Nichols (1823) 

 Calendar of State Papers Scotland, 1574–81

Z

1540s births
1608 deaths
English MPs 1586–1587
English people of Scottish descent
Members of the Privy Council of England
17th-century English diplomats
16th-century Scottish people
17th-century Scottish people
16th-century English diplomats